The Late-May 2010 tornado outbreak was a tornado outbreak that begun on May 22, 2010 and ended May 25. The storm system responsible for the tornadoes affected a large area from North Dakota to New Mexico. The system that caused the outbreak formed from a low-pressure system that was located in Canada.

Meteorological synopsis
On May 20, a strong low pressure system moved on to the British Columbia coast, bringing with it a cold front over the Rockies, although it produced no showers. Two days later, on May 22, the cold front detached from the low pressure system and connected with a warm front from the Southeastern United States and another low pressure system over Wyoming. Dry line activity increased over the Great Plains and many tornadoes formed in South Dakota. The worst of these tornadoes was rated an EF4 pending further analysis. The next day, on May 23, the warm front joined a portion of the cold front and became an occluded front. The cold front once again joined the Canadian low pressure system. Dry line activity held steady and a number of more tornadoes formed across the Great Plains. Many meteorologists believed that Monday, May 24 would be one of the most active tornado days. Dr. Greg Forbes of the Weather Channel issued an 8/10 risk of tornadoes for spots in the Great Plains. A front was stationed over South Dakota, bringing fast moving supercells and tornadoes from North Dakota to Texas.  The next day, more severe thunderstorms fired up, but severe activity shifted east and south. VORTEX2 was able to get valuable information when tracking a supercell that produced 3 tornadoes, each weak and short-lived.

Confirmed tornadoes

May 22 event

May 23 event

May 24 event

May 25 event

Bowdle, South Dakota

The EF4 Bowdle tornado started in Walworth County at EF2 intensity 4 miles west of the city of Bowdle, South Dakota. The tornado touched down directly on a farmstead and it was the most damaged structure in the immediate area. Several outbuildings were destroyed. A residence in the area sustained roof damage but the building was not severely damaged. Moving into Edmunds County, the tornado weakened to EF1 intensity. Grain bins were tossed and destroyed. Debris was flung hundreds of yards from the tornado. A structure suffered some shingle and antenna damage. The tornado then quickly strengthened into an EF3 tornado  NW of Bowdle. A large number of outbuildings were severely damaged or destroyed. Tree damage was widespread in the area. Many houses and outbuildings in the area suffered major damage. Trees were debarked and cars were thrown into the air. Transmission towers were toppled. One of them was torn off its concrete footings and was thrown hundreds of yards away. The tornado then shifted directions and moved eastwards at  EF2 intensity. A state radio tower was toppled before the tornado lifted shortly thereafter.

See also
Tornadoes of 2010
List of United States tornadoes in May 2010
List of F4 and EF4 tornadoes
List of F4 and EF4 tornadoes (2010–2019)

References

Tornadoes in Colorado
F4 tornadoes by date
Tornadoes in Kansas
Tornadoes in Nebraska
Tornadoes in South Dakota
05-22
Tornado Outbreak
Tornado Outbreak